Smith Mountain, is a peak in the Black Mountains of the Amargosa Range in Death Valley National Park in California.

It is named after Francis Marion "Borax" Smith, of the local Pacific Coast Borax Company enterprise.

See also
20 Mule Team Borax
Harmony Borax Works
Francis Marion Smith
Death Valley Railroad

References

External links
 

Death Valley
Mountains of Inyo County, California
Mountains of Death Valley National Park
Mojave Desert
Mountains of the Mojave Desert